Robert Donald Whalen (born January 31, 1994) is an American professional baseball pitcher for the Acereros de Monclova of the Mexican League. He previously played for the Atlanta Braves and the Seattle Mariners.

Early life
Whalen's parents are from Queens, New York City, and moved to the Pocono Mountains to raise their children. After Whalen's older sisters graduated from high school, the Whalens moved to Florida, where Whalen would have a better opportunity to pursue a career in baseball. He graduated from Haines City High School in Haines City, Florida.

Professional career

New York Mets
The New York Mets selected Whalen in the 12th round of the 2012 MLB Draft. Whalen had committed to attend Florida Atlantic University to play college baseball for the Florida Atlantic Owls.

After pitching for the Savannah Sand Gnats of the Class A South Atlantic League during the 2014 season, Whalen pitched in the Arizona Fall League, where he worked on the development of his changeup. The Mets assigned him to the St. Lucie Mets of the Class A-Advanced Florida State League to begin the 2015 season.

Atlanta Braves
On July 24, the Mets traded Whalen and John Gant to the Atlanta Braves for Juan Uribe and Kelly Johnson. The Braves assigned Whalen to their A Advanced affiliate, the Carolina Mudcats of the Carolina League. In 2016, Whalen began the season with the Mississippi Braves of the Class AA Southern League, and was promoted to the Gwinnett Braves of the Class AAA International League in July.

The Braves promoted Whalen to make his major league debut on August 3, 2016. He faced the Pittsburgh Pirates, and allowed four earned runs over five innings to earn the victory. Whalen was placed on the disabled list with a diagnosis of shoulder fatigue on August 25, and did not pitch for the rest of the season. In September, the Mississippi Braves named Whalen Pitcher of the Year.

Seattle Mariners
On November 28, 2016, Whalen and Max Povse were traded to the Seattle Mariners organization in exchange for Alex Jackson and Tyler Pike. Whalen was designated for assignment on September 1, 2018.

Whalen announced his retirement from professional baseball on February 25, 2019, citing his battle with depression and anxiety as the main reason for doing so.

New York Mets (second stint)
On January 27, 2020, Whalen came out of retirement and signed a minor league contract with the New York Mets organization. Whalen did not play in a game in 2020 due to the cancellation of the minor league season because of the COVID-19 pandemic. He was released on May 20, 2020.

Minnesota Twins
On March 5, 2021, Whalen signed with the West Virginia Power of the Atlantic League of Professional Baseball. However, on May 5, before the ALPB season began, Whalen signed a minor league contract with the Minnesota Twins organization. In 11 appearances split between the Double-A Wichita Wind Surge and the Triple-A St. Paul Saints, Whalen struggled to an 0-4 record with an 8.63 ERA and 19 strikeouts. On August 10, 2021, Whalen was released by the Twins.

Washington Wild Things
On August 23, 2021, Whalen became the first former MLB player to sign with the Washington Wild Things. In 4 appearances in the regular season, Whalen went 2-0 with 15.1 innings pitched, a 1.76 ERA, 18 strikeouts and a 1.43 WHIP. In the postseason, he started 3 games and went 1-2 with 19 innings pitched, a 3.78 ERA, 22 strikeouts and a 1.16 WHIP. In the semi-finals, he lost Game 1 vs Équipe Québec but pitched 8 shutout innings in Game 5 to help clinch the finals vs the Schaumburg Boomers. In the finals, he lost Game 4 after pitching 7 innings with 3 runs allowed and struck out 9. Washington would ultimately lose the finals the next day, blowing a 2-1 series lead.

On February 10, 2022, Whalen re-signed with the Wild Things for the 2022 season.

On December 5, 2022, Whalen was released by the Wild Things by having his contract option declined.

Acereros de Monclova
On December 14, 2022, Whalen signed with the Acereros de Monclova of the Mexican League.

Pitching style
Despite being an effective ground ball pitcher, Whalen stated that he would actively seek the strikeout whenever a two-strike count arose. By not focusing on the strikeout, at the suggestion of Mississippi Braves pitching coach Dennis Lewallyn, Whalen's strikeouts per nine innings actually rose throughout the 2016 season, and led to his promotion to the major leagues.

References

External links

1994 births
Living people
People from Stroudsburg, Pennsylvania
People from Haines City, Florida
Baseball players from Pennsylvania
Baseball players from Florida
Major League Baseball pitchers
Atlanta Braves players
Seattle Mariners players
Kingsport Mets players
Savannah Sand Gnats players
Gulf Coast Mets players
Scottsdale Scorpions players
St. Lucie Mets players
Carolina Mudcats players
Mississippi Braves players
Gwinnett Braves players
Tacoma Rainiers players
Everett AquaSox players
Arkansas Travelers players
Wichita Wind Surge players
St. Paul Saints players
Washington Wild Things players